Thomas Alva Edison High School is one of twenty-five high schools in Fairfax County, Virginia, United States. Thomas Edison is an International Baccalaureate school.
Edison High School has traditionally been a relatively small public high school in terms of the size of its student population. It has a culturally and ethnically diverse student body. Its student body and graduating classes in the mid- and late 1990s and early 2000s included students of Australia, Korean, Eritrean, Vietnamese, Chinese, Thai, Cambodian, Polish, Italian, Mexican, Colombian, Ghanaian, Cameroonian, and Pakistani ancestries or nationalities. The diverse religious backgrounds of the students ranged from as some examples from Christians to Buddhists, Muslim, Jews, and etc . The school's diversity clearly reflected the massive influx of immigrants to the Northern Virginia region generally.

In the 1990s, the school's debate and forensics teams gained widespread and even national recognition for their achievements in those fields. Its academic team has appeared on the local television quizbowl game show "It's Academic", which is broadcast by the local Washington, DC PBS affiliate stations, WETA PBS & WETA METRO.

Edison's graduates have typically moved on to attend local and state colleges and universities such as Virginia Tech, the University of Virginia, George Mason University, Virginia Commonwealth University, Northern Virginia Community College, and George Mason University. Prominent graduates of the school have included Jan Smith, a local television news reporter and wife of nationally renowned TV journalist Sam Donaldson, and Eric Barton, a professional American football player with the National Football League.

In both 1996 and 1997 Edison's theater club won second place and then first place and the regional level of the VHSL one-act play festival.

Demographics
Presented below are some demographics for Thomas Edison during the 2021-22 school year:

Test scores
Edison High School is a fully accredited high school based on the Standards of Learning tests in Virginia.  The average SAT score in 2006 for Edison was a 1494 (502 in Critical Readng,  505 in Math, and 487 in Writing).

The Edison Academy
The Edison Academy is a career center that 10th-12th graders can take courses based on a career they want to do when they finish school. It helps them build the skills they need for a successful career in the future. Edison High School is one of the selected schools in Fairfax County to have an academy center.

IB Program 
Edison High School is 1 of 33 schools in the state of Virginia to have an IB program. The program at Edison is a Global STEM Challenges Program. It is a 3 year long program from 9th grade to 11th grade. The IB program classes are located in the academy wing of the school.

Athletics
Edison participates in the AAA National District of the 6A North Region.
Sports offered to students include:

Cheerleading
Cross Country (CoEd)
Field Hockey
Football
Golf (CoEd)
Volleyball
Basketball (Boys and Girls)
Gymnastics
Swim & Dive (CoEd)
Indoor Track & Field (CoEd)
Baseball
Lacrosse (Boys and Girls)
Soccer (Boys and Girls)
Softball
Outdoor Track & Field (CoEd)
Wrestling

Notable alumni
 Eric Barton, NFL linebacker
 Charlie Hales, mayor of Portland, Oregon
 Andy Najar, soccer player
 Pat Toomay, 1966, former NFL defensive end

References

External links
Main Website

Educational institutions established in 1963
High schools in Fairfax County, Virginia
Public high schools in Virginia
1963 establishments in Virginia